Lissospira striata is a species of sea snail, a marine gastropod mollusk in the family Skeneidae.

Description
The height of the shell attains 1.5 mm, its diameter 2 mm. The shell consists of about three convex whorls forming a comparatively low, somewhat depressed spire. The entire surface below the relatively large, little raised, smooth nuclear whorl, is covered with raised, rounded, well-separated, revolving microscopic threads, most distinct on the base. The small umbilicus is scarcely more than a chink. The aperture and the operculum are typical.

Distribution
This species occurs in the Atlantic Ocean off New England, USA, found off Martha's Vineyard.

References

External links
 To Encyclopedia of Life
 To USNM Invertebrate Zoology Mollusca Collection
 To World Register of Marine Species

striata
Gastropods described in 1897